William Berry Acker, Jr. (born November 7, 1956 in Freer, Texas) is a former professional American football player who played defensive tackle for six seasons for the St. Louis Cardinals, the Kansas City Chiefs, and the Buffalo Bills. His brother Jim is a former MLB pitcher.

References

1956 births
Living people
People from Freer, Texas
Players of American football from Texas
American football defensive tackles
Texas Longhorns football players
St. Louis Cardinals (football) players
Kansas City Chiefs players
Buffalo Bills players